Charles Russell Payne (May 14, 1902 – June 1970) was an American middle-distance runner. He competed in the men's 3000 metres steeplechase at the 1924 Summer Olympics.

References

External links
 

1902 births
1970 deaths
Athletes (track and field) at the 1924 Summer Olympics
American male middle-distance runners
American male steeplechase runners
Olympic track and field athletes of the United States
Track and field athletes from Cincinnati
20th-century American people